Neosepicaea is a genus of flowering plants belonging to the family Bignoniaceae.

Its native range is New Guinea to Queensland.

Species
Species:

Neosepicaea aurantiaca 
Neosepicaea jucunda 
Neosepicaea leptophylla 
Neosepicaea viticoides

References

Bignoniaceae
Bignoniaceae genera